Gastrulation is the stage in the early embryonic development of most animals, during which the blastula (a single-layered hollow sphere of cells), or in mammals the blastocyst is reorganized into a multilayered structure known as the gastrula. Before gastrulation, the embryo is a continuous epithelial sheet of cells; by the end of gastrulation, the embryo has begun differentiation to establish distinct cell lineages, set up the basic axes of the body (e.g. dorsal-ventral, anterior-posterior), and internalized one or more cell types including the prospective gut.

In triploblastic organisms, the gastrula is trilaminar (three-layered). These three germ layers are the ectoderm (outer layer), mesoderm (middle layer), and endoderm (inner layer). In diploblastic organisms, such as Cnidaria and Ctenophora, the gastrula has only ectoderm and endoderm. The two layers are also sometimes referred to as the hypoblast and epiblast. Sponges do not go through the gastrula stage, which is why they are basal among all animals.

Gastrulation takes place after cleavage and the formation of the blastula, or blastocyst. Gastrulation is followed by organogenesis, when individual organs develop within the newly formed germ layers. Each layer gives rise to specific tissues and organs in the developing embryo.
 The ectoderm gives rise to epidermis, the nervous system, and to the neural crest in vertebrates.
 The endoderm gives rise to the epithelium of the digestive system and respiratory system, and organs associated with the digestive system, such as the liver and pancreas.
 The mesoderm gives rise to many cell types such as muscle, bone, and connective tissue. In vertebrates, mesoderm derivatives include the notochord, the heart, blood and blood vessels, the cartilage of the ribs and vertebrae, and the dermis.
Following gastrulation, cells in the body are either organized into sheets of connected cells (as in epithelia), or as a mesh of isolated cells, such as mesenchyme.

Although gastrulation patterns exhibit enormous variation throughout the animal kingdom, they are unified by the five basic types of cell movements that occur during gastrulation: 
 Invagination
 Involution
 Ingression
 Delamination
 Epiboly

The terms "gastrula" and "gastrulation" were coined by Ernst Haeckel, in his 1872 work "Biology of Calcareous Sponges". Lewis Wolpert, pioneering developmental biologist in the field, has been credited for noting that "It is not birth, marriage, or death, but gastrulation which is truly the most important time in your life."

Model systems

Gastrulation is highly variable across the animal kingdom but has underlying similarities. Gastrulation has been studied in many animals, but some models have been used for longer than others. Furthermore, it is easier to study development in animals that develop outside the mother. Model organisms whose gastrulation is understood in the greatest detail include the mollusc, sea urchin, frog, and chicken. A human model system is the gastruloid.

Protostomes versus deuterostomes

The distinction between protostomes and deuterostomes is based on the direction in which the mouth (stoma) develops in relation to the blastopore. Protostome derives from the Greek word protostoma meaning "first mouth" (πρῶτος + στόμα) whereas Deuterostome's etymology is "second mouth" from the words second and mouth (δεύτερος + στόμα).

The major distinctions between deuterostomes and protostomes are found in embryonic development:
 Mouth/anus
 In protostome development, the first opening in development, the blastopore, becomes the animal's mouth.
 In deuterostome development, the blastopore becomes the animal's anus.
 Cleavage
 Protostomes have what is known as spiral cleavage which is determinate, meaning that the fate of the cells is determined as they are formed.
 Deuterostomes have what is known as radial cleavage that is indeterminate.

Sea urchins
Sea urchins have been important model organisms in developmental biology since the 19th century. Their gastrulation is often considered the archetype for invertebrate deuterostomes. Experiments along with computer simulations have been used to gain knowledge about gastrulation in the sea urchin. Recent simulations found that planar cell polarity is sufficient to drive sea urchin gastrulation.

Germ layer determination
Sea urchins exhibit highly stereotyped cleavage patterns and cell fates. Maternally deposited mRNAs establish the organizing center of the sea urchin embryo. Canonical Wnt and Delta-Notch signaling progressively segregate progressive endoderm and mesoderm.

Cell internalization
In sea urchins the first cells to internalize are the primary mesenchyme cells (PMCs), which have a skeletogenic fate, which ingress during the blastula stage. Gastrulation – internalization of the prospective endoderm and non-skeletogenic mesoderm – begins shortly thereafter with invagination and other cell rearrangements the vegetal pole, which contribute approximately 30% to the final archenteron length. The gut's final length depends on cell rearrangements within the archenteron.

Amphibians

The frog genus Xenopus has been used as a model organism for the study of gastrulation.

Symmetry breaking
The sperm contributes one of the two mitotic asters needed to complete first cleavage. The sperm can enter anywhere in the animal half of the egg but its exact point of entry will break the egg's radial symmetry by organizing the cytoskeleton. Prior to first cleavage, the egg's cortex rotates relative to the internal cytoplasm by the coordinated action of microtubules, in a process known as cortical rotation. This displacement brings maternally loaded determinants of cell fate from the equatorial cytoplasm and vegetal cortex into contact, and together these determinants set up the organizer. Thus, the area on the vegetal side opposite the sperm entry point will become the organizer. Hilde Mangold, working in the lab of Hans Spemann, demonstrated that this special "organizer" of the embryo is necessary and sufficient to induce gastrulation.

Germ layer determination
Specification of endoderm depends on rearrangement of maternally deposited determinants, leading to nuclearization of Beta-catenin. Mesoderm is induced by signaling from the presumptive endoderm to cells that would otherwise become ectoderm.

Cell internalization
The dorsal lip of the blastopore is the mechanical driver of gastrulation. The first sign of invagination seen in the frog is the dorsal lip.

Cell signaling 
In the frog, Xenopus, one of the signals is retinoic acid (RA). RA signaling in this organism can affect the formation of the endoderm and depending on the timing of the signaling, it can determine the fate whether its pancreatic, intestinal, or respiratory. Other signals such as Wnt and BMP also play a role in respiratory fate of the Xenopus by activating cell lineage tracers.

Amniotes

Overview
In amniotes (reptiles, birds and mammals), gastrulation involves the creation of the blastopore, an opening into the archenteron. Note that the blastopore is not an opening into the blastocoel, the space within the blastula, but represents a new inpocketing that pushes the existing surfaces of the blastula together. In amniotes, gastrulation occurs in the following sequence: (1) the embryo becomes asymmetric; (2) the primitive streak forms; (3) cells from the epiblast at the primitive streak undergo an epithelial to mesenchymal transition and ingress at the primitive streak to form the germ layers.

Symmetry breaking
In preparation for gastrulation, the embryo must become asymmetric along both the proximal-distal axis and the anteroposterior axis. The proximal-distal axis is formed when the cells of the embryo form the “egg cylinder,” which consists of the extraembryonic tissues, which give rise to structures like the placenta, at the proximal end and the epiblast at the distal end.  Many signaling pathways contribute to this reorganization, including BMP, FGF, nodal, and Wnt. Visceral endoderm surrounds the epiblast. The distal visceral endoderm (DVE) migrates to the anterior portion of the embryo, forming the anterior visceral endoderm (AVE). This breaks anterior-posterior symmetry and is regulated by nodal signaling.

Germ layer determination
The primitive streak is formed at the beginning of gastrulation and is found at the junction between the extraembryonic tissue and the epiblast on the posterior side of the embryo and the site of ingression. Formation of the primitive streak is reliant upon nodal signaling in the Koller's sickle within the cells contributing to the primitive streak and BMP4 signaling from the extraembryonic tissue. Furthermore, Cer1 and Lefty1 restrict the primitive streak to the appropriate location by antagonizing nodal signaling. The region defined as the primitive streak continues to grow towards the distal tip.

During the early stages of development, the primitive streak is the structure that will establish bilateral symmetry, determine the site of gastrulation and initiate germ layer formation. To form the streak, reptiles, birds and mammals arrange mesenchymal cells along the prospective midline, establishing the first embryonic axis, as well as the place where cells will ingress and migrate during  the process of gastrulation and germ layer formation. The primitive streak extends through this midline and creates the antero-posterior body axis, becoming the first symmetry-breaking event in the embryo, and marks the beginning of gastrulation. This process involves the ingression of mesoderm and endoderm progenitors and their migration to their ultimate position, where they will differentiate  into the three germ layers. The localization of the cell adhesion and signaling molecule beta-catenin is critical to the proper formation of the organizer region that is responsible for initiating gastrulation.

Cell internalization
In order for the cells to move from the epithelium of the epiblast through the primitive streak to form a new layer, the cells must undergo an epithelial to mesenchymal transition (EMT) to lose their epithelial characteristics, such as cell-cell adhesion. FGF signaling is necessary for proper EMT. FGFR1 is needed for the up regulation of SNAI1, which down regulates E-cadherin, causing a loss of cell adhesion. Following the EMT, the cells ingress through the primitive streak and spread out to form a new layer of cells or join existing layers.  FGF8 is implicated in the process of this dispersal from the primitive streak.

Cell signaling 
There are certain signals that play a role in determination and formation of the three germ layers, such as FGF, RA, and Wnt. In mammals such as mice, RA signaling can play a role in lung formation. If there isn't enough RA, there will be an error in the lung production. RA also regulates the respiratory competence in this mouse model.

Cell signaling driving gastrulation 
During gastrulation, the cells are differentiated into the ectoderm or mesendoderm, which then separates into the mesoderm and endoderm. The endoderm and mesoderm form due to the nodal signaling. Nodal signaling uses ligands that are part of TGFβ family. These ligands will signal transmembrane serine/threonine kinase receptors, and this will then phosphorylate Smad2 and Smad3. This protein will then attach itself to Smad4 and relocate to the nucleus where the mesendoderm genes will begin to be transcribed. The Wnt pathway along with β-catenin plays a key role in nodal signaling and endoderm formation. Fibroblast growth factors (FGF), canonical Wnt pathway, bone morphogenetic protein (BMP), and retinoic acid (RA) are all important in the formation and development of the endoderm. FGF are important in producing the homeobox gene which regulates early anatomical development. BMP signaling plays a role in the liver and promotes hepatic fate. RA signaling also induce homeobox genes such as Hoxb1 and Hoxa5. In mice, if there is a lack in RA signaling the mouse won't develop lungs. RA signaling also has multiple uses in organ formation of the pharyngeal arches, the foregut, and hindgut.

Gastrulation in vitro 
There have been a number of attempts to understand the processes of gastrulation using in vitro techniques in parallel and complementary to studies in embryos, usually though the use of 2D and 3D cell (Embryonic organoids) culture techniques using Embryonic stem cells (ESCs) or induced pluripotent stem cells (iPSCs). These are associated with number of clear advantages in using tissue-culture based protocols, some of which include reducing the cost of associated in vivo work (thereby reducing, replacing and refining the use of animals in experiments; the 3Rs), being able to accurately apply agonists/antagonists in spatially and temporally specific manner which may be technically difficult to perform during Gastrulation. However, it is important to relate the observations in culture to the processes occurring in the embryo for context.

To illustrate this, the guided differentiation of mouse ESCs has resulted in generating primitive streak-like cells that display many of the characteristics of epiblast cells that traverse through the primitive streak (e.g. transient brachyury up regulation and the cellular changes associated with an epithelial to mesenchymal transition), and human ESCs cultured on micro patterns, treated with BMP4, can generate spatial differentiation pattern similar to the arrangement of the germ layers in the human embryo. Finally, using 3D embryoid body- and organoid-based techniques, small aggregates of mouse ESCs (Embryonic Organoids, or Gastruloids) are able to show a number of processes of early mammalian embryo development such as symmetry-breaking, polarisation of gene expression, gastrulation-like movements, axial elongation and the generation of all three embryonic axes (anteroposterior, dorsoventral and left-right axes).

In vitro fertilization occurs in a laboratory. The process of in vitro fertilization is when mature eggs are removed from the ovaries and are placed in a cultured medium where they are fertilized by sperm. In the culture the embryo will form. 14 days after fertilization the primitive streak forms. The formation of the primitive streak has been known to some countries as “human individuality." This means that the embryo is now a being itself, it is its own entity. The countries that believe this have created a 14-day rule in which it is illegal to study or experiment on a human embryo after the 14-day period in vitro. Research has been conducted on the first 14 days of an embryo, but no known studies have been done after the 14 days. With the rule in place, mice embryos are used understand the development after 14 days; however, there are differences in the development between mice and humans.

See also
 Blastocyst
 Deuterostome
 Fate mapping
 Primitive knot
 Invagination
 Neurulation
 Protostome
 Vegetal rotation

References

Notes

Bibliography

Further reading

External links
 Gastrulation animations 
 Gastrulation illustrations and movies from Gastrulation: From Cells To Embryo edited by Claudio Stern
 A video of frog gastrulation

Gastrulation
Animal developmental biology
Embryology
)